Lepidophyma mayae, the Mayan tropical night lizard, is a species of lizard in the family Xantusiidae. It is a small lizard found in Mexico, Honduras, Guatemala, and Belize.

References

Lepidophyma
Reptiles of Belize
Reptiles of Guatemala
Reptiles of Honduras
Reptiles of Mexico
Reptiles described in 1973
Taxa named by Robert L. Bezy